The  Chemical Society of Mexico (Spanish: Sociedad Química de México; SQM) is a learned society (professional association) based in Mexico which supports scientific inquiry and education in the field of chemistry.

The Society organizes two annual congresses, one for general chemistry and the other for chemical education, and publishes the Journal of the Mexican Chemical Society (prior to 2005, Revista de la Sociedad Química de México). It also awards the annual Andrés Manuel Del Río and Mario Molina Prizes, as well as prizes for the best theses in chemistry at bachelors, masters and doctoral level.

External links
"Sociedad Química de México, A.C."
Journal of the Mexican Chemical Society
Boletín de la Sociedad Química de México

Chemistry societies
1956 establishments in Mexico
Scientific organizations established in 1956
Professional associations based in Mexico
Scientific organizations based in Mexico